Berryman QPRS, also known as the Berryman Quality Point Rating System is a mathematical rating system developed by Clyde P. Berryman to rate sports teams and competitors.  The Berryman QPRS system considers strength of schedule, win–loss record, points scored, and points allowed.  Berryman applied his QPRS system to select college football national champions on a current basis from 1990 to 2011.  He also applied the QPRS system retroactively to select national champions for each year from 1920 to 1989.  The Berryman QPRS is one of the rating systems used to select historic national champions that is recognized by the National Collegiate Athletic Association (NCAA) in its Football Bowl Subdivision record book.

Berryman QPRS national champions
The following list identifies the college football national champions as selected by the Berryman QPRS methodology.

 Retroactive

 Contemporaneous

See also
NCAA Division I FBS national football championship

References

College football championships